Christian Reif (born 24 October 1984 in Speyer) is a retired German long jumper.

He finished ninth at the 2007 World Championships. He had previously competed at the 2007 European Indoor Championships without reaching the final.

His then personal best jump is 8.47 metres, achieved during the 2010 European Championships, in which he won the gold medal.  In 2014 he extended his personal best to 8.49 metres.

Competition record

External links 

 
 
 
 
 
 

1984 births
Living people
People from Speyer
German male long jumpers
German national athletics champions
Athletes (track and field) at the 2012 Summer Olympics
Olympic athletes of Germany
European Athletics Championships medalists
Sportspeople from Rhineland-Palatinate